Eléonor Lucien Ernest Duquesne (17 October 1900 – 7 May 1991) was a French runner who competed in 3000 m – 10,000 m events at the 1920, 1924 and 1928 Summer Olympics. His best achievements were fourth place in the team 3000 m event in 1920 and 1924 and sixth place in the 3000 m steeplechase in 1928.

In the first laps of the 1928 steeplechase semifinal, Paavo Nurmi fell at the water jump, and Duquesne stopped and helped him out. In return, Nurmi paced Duquesne through the rest of the race, thereby helping him to reach the final.

Duquesne competed at the International Cross Country Championships in 1920 and 1923, finishing seventh on both occasions and winning two medals with the French team.

References

External links
 

1900 births
1991 deaths
Sportspeople from Seine-Maritime
French male long-distance runners
French male steeplechase runners
Olympic athletes of France
Athletes (track and field) at the 1920 Summer Olympics
Athletes (track and field) at the 1924 Summer Olympics
Athletes (track and field) at the 1928 Summer Olympics
20th-century French people